

Swithwulf was a medieval Bishop of Rochester. He was consecrated between 868 and 880. He died between 893 and 896.

Citations

References

External links
 

Bishops of Rochester
9th-century English bishops
9th-century deaths
Year of birth unknown